Odontomesa is a genus of midges in the non-biting midge family (Chironomidae).

Species
O. ferringtoni Sæther, 1985
O. fulva (Kieffer, 1919)
O. lutosopra (Garrett, 1925)

References

Chironomidae